Walter Jesse Kitundu (born July 3, 1973) is a musical instrument builder, graphic artist, and musical composer from San Francisco, California.

Biography
Kitundu was born in Rochester, Minnesota and spent his early years in Tanzania. He returned to Minnesota from age 8 to 25, then moved to the San Francisco Bay Area in approximately 1998.  He currently lives in Chicago.

Career and Works
 Described as a renaissance man, Kitundu is inventor of the "phonoharp", a stringed instrument incorporating a phonograph.  After hearing the instrument, the Kronos Quartet hired Kitundu as their "instrument builder in residence".  In addition to a phonoharp he also built a "phonoharp" for each of the quartet's members. For the song "Tèw semagn hagèré" on their 2009 album Floodplain, he created new instruments inspired by the begena, an Ethiopian 10-string lyre.

As of 2008 Kitundu is a "Multimedia Artist" with the Exploratorium, artist in residence at the Headlands Center for the Arts, and a Distinguished visiting professor of "Wood Arts" at the California College of the Arts.

Kitundu is also a wildlife photographer, with a specialty in hawks and other raptors.

Awards
In September 2008, Kitundu won a MacArthur fellowship.

References

External links
 kitundu.com - professional website

American male composers
21st-century American composers
Inventors of musical instruments
Living people
MacArthur Fellows
Musicians from the San Francisco Bay Area
Artists from the San Francisco Bay Area
People from Rochester, Minnesota
1973 births
21st-century American male musicians